Valentín Alsina is a city in the Lanús Partido of Buenos Aires Province, Argentina. It is located next to Buenos Aires city in the Gran Buenos Aires urban area.

History
The city was named after Valentín Alsina (1802–1869), two-time Governor of the independent State of Buenos Aires. It is considered one of the historical 'cien barrios porteños,' one of the 100 'barrios' of the city.

Notable residents
 Jorge Carrascosa (born 1948), former footballer
 Gustavo Adrián López (b. 1973), footballer
 Mabel Manzotti (1938–2012), film, stage, and television actress
 Ricardo Montaner (born 1957), singer and songwriter
 Edmundo Rivero (1911-1986), tango singer and composer
 Sandro (1945–2010), singer and actor

Twin towns and sister cities
 Nápoles, Italy
 Nouméa, New Caledonia
 Caracas, Venezuela
 Vilnius, Lithuania
 Polla, Italy

References

External links

Alsina Online - News and City Stories 

Lanús Partido
Populated places in Buenos Aires Province
Populated places established in 1874
Cities in Argentina
1874 establishments in Argentina
Argentina